Homoeocera rodriguezi is a moth of the subfamily Arctiinae first described by Herbert Druce in 1890. It is found in Mexico, Guatemala and Costa Rica.

References

Euchromiina
Moths described in 1890